Haeju Oh clan is a Korean clan. Their Bon-gwan is in Haeju, Hwanghae Province. , the clan has a membership of 422735.

References